Bërzhitë is a village and a former municipality in the Tirana County, central Albania. At the 2015 local government reform it became a subdivision of the municipality Tirana. The population at the 2011 census was 4,973. The municipal unit consists of the villages Ibë, Ibë e Poshtme, Bërzhitë, Dobresh, Pëllumbas, Mihajas-Cirmë, Kus, Fravesh, Kllojkë, Pashkashesh, Lugë-Shalqizë, Rozaverë. Near it flows the river Erzen.

References

Former municipalities in Tirana County
Administrative units of Tirana
Villages in Tirana County